The crew of the Titanic were among the estimated 2,240, people who sailed on the maiden voyage of the second of the White Star Line's Olympic-class ocean liners, from Southampton, England to New York City in the United States. Halfway through the voyage, the ship struck an iceberg and sank in the early morning of 15 April 1912, resulting in the deaths of over 1,500 people, including approximately 688 crew members.

Crew 

The following is a full list of known crew members who sailed on the maiden voyage of the RMS Titanic.

Included in this list are the nine-member Guarantee Group and the eight members of the ship's band, who were given passenger accommodations and treated as both passengers and crew. They are also included in the list of passengers on board RMS Titanic.

Crew members are colour-coded, indicating whether they were saved or perished.
 The crew member did not survive
 The crew member survived

Survivors are listed with the lifeboat from which they were known to be rescued by the RMS Carpathia, on 15 April 1912.

Victims whose remains were recovered after the sinking are listed with a superscript next to the body number, indicating the recovery vessel:
MB – CS Mackay-Bennett (bodies 1–306)
M – CS Minia (bodies 307–323)
MM – CGS Montmagny (bodies 326–329)
A – SS Algerine (body 330)
O – RMS Oceanic (bodies 331–333)
I – SS Ilford (body 334)
OT – SS Ottawa (body 335)

Numbers 324 and 325 were unused, and the six bodies buried at sea by the Carpathia also went unnumbered. Several recovered bodies were unidentifiable and thus not all numbers are matched with a person.

Upon recovery, the bodies of 209 identified and unidentified victims of the sinking were brought to Halifax, Nova Scotia. Of those, 121 were taken to the non-denominational Fairview Lawn Cemetery, 59 were repatriated, 19 were buried in the Roman Catholic Mount Olivet Cemetery, and 10 were taken to the Jewish Baron de Hirsch Cemetery. The bodies of the remaining recovered victims were either delivered to family members or buried at sea.

The "Hometown" field may be misleading. Many crews had secondary or temporary addresses in Southampton, which they gave when signing the crew list, and others may have only recently relocated there. In particular, the number of crew from Merseyside is understated; for example, Chief Engineer Joseph Bell and Chief Steward Andrew Latimer lived with their families in the Liverpool area. Dr. Alan Scarth, in his book Titanic and Liverpool, identifies 115 crew members with close connections to the city, of whom only 28 survived.

Officers

Deck 

The Titanic employed:
One able officer, also known as a bosun or boatswain, who had seniority over all the unlicensed deck crew. The able officer, an experienced crewman of the White Star Line, assisted Thomas Andrews in his daily inspections around the ship.
 Two medical doctors, one senior and one junior, titled Surgeon and Assistant Surgeon respectively. They were responsible for treating injuries and illnesses on board involving passengers (of any class) or crew and had access to the ship's hospital and store of pharmaceuticals. Neither medical officer survived the sinking. 
29 able seamen, who had completed additional training and usually had seniority over other crew members. They carried out the day-to-day operations of the ship. In addition, they were trained to operate the lifeboat davits and man the lifeboats themselves. Each able seaman was assigned to a lifeboat and take charge of that boat if no officer were present. About eight of these men were lost when they went below decks to open the E Deck gangway and were never seen again. As almost all the remaining able seamen had departed in the first lifeboats launched, the lifeboats launched subsequently had a shortage of trained seamen to man them. As a result, a few stokers and even victualling stewards (some of whom had no experience with lifeboats) were ordered to man the launching and rowing of the boats. In one instance, a passenger with yachting experience (Arthur Godfrey Peuchen) was put in co-command of a lifeboat. Nineteen of these survived the sinking.
Two Boatswain Mates, experienced seamen who managed the deck lines, deck cranes, winches, lifeboat davits, etc. on the deck.  At least one survived.
Two Masters-at-Arms, who, along with the Chief Officer, held the only keys to the firearms cabinet.  One survived, one was lost.
Seven quartermasters (all of whom survived); highly trained seamen who worked on and around the bridge to steer the ship as helmsmen, manage signal flags, and stand watch on the bridge to assist the Duty Officer with general navigation.
Two window cleaners.  One survived, one was lost.
Six lookouts (all of whom survived), who worked two to a shift in the crow's nest; the shifts lasted only two hours at a time because of extremely cold winds which lookouts were exposed to in the open crow's nest. Despite the myths, lookouts were never supposed to have binoculars. They were supposed to see the object and not identify it. The binoculars would have made the view area even smaller and not help at all since the iceberg was practically invisible to the human eye.

Engineering 
The engineers were responsible for keeping the engines, generators, and other mechanical equipment on the Titanic running. They were the highest paid members of the crew and had the education and technical expertise to operate, maintain, and repair the engineering plant.

Shortly after leaving Southampton, a fire was discovered in the coal bunker of No 6 Boiler Room. For a number of days, coal trimmers were detailed to trace the source of the fire and extinguish it.

On the night of 14 April, the Second Engineering Officer, John Henry Hesketh – the senior engineer on duty, and Leading Fireman Frederick Barrett were in No 6 Boiler inspecting the coal bunker and confirming the fire was out when the Titanic struck the iceberg at 11.40 pm. It ripped this part of the ship and the pair escaped through the connecting tunnel to No 5 Boiler Room, closing the bulkhead doors. Barrett later gave evidence at the Southampton Enquiry.

Most of the engineering crew remained below decks in the engine and boiler rooms: some fighting a losing battle to keep the ship afloat by operating the pumps in the forward compartments as well as keeping the steam up in the boiler rooms, so as to prevent boiler explosion on contact with the water; and others keeping the generators running to maintain power and lights throughout the Titanic up until two minutes before the ship sank. It is speculated that their actions delayed the sinking for over an hour and helped keep the ship afloat long enough for nearly all the lifeboats to be launched. Some of the men working downstairs were killed when seawater flooded this section as the ship hit the iceberg.

The RMS Titanic employed
25 engineers; all were lost.
2 boilermakers; both were lost.
13 leading firemen (Stoker Foremen) and 163 firemen (Stokers). The ship had 29 boilers, 25 containing six furnaces each, four containing three furnaces each, for a total of 162 furnaces. Each fireman was assigned one boiler and three furnaces. Of the Titanic'''s six boiler rooms, each leading fireman was assigned to two of them with 10 to 15 firemen under him. Next to each boiler was a coal chute that deposited coal from the overhead coal bunkers, and a fireman with a shovel would constantly feed coal into the three furnaces. Shifts for all the firemen and their foremen were four hours on and eight hours off. The heat in the boiler rooms usually exceeded , so a four-hour shift was very demanding. Most of the firemen worked wearing only their undershirts and shorts. Of the firemen, only three leading firemen and around 45 other firemen survived. Several of the firemen who survived got into the lifeboats dressed only in their undershirts and shorts in  weather.
73 trimmers, or coal trimmers, on the Titanic. Of the engineering crew, the trimmers were paid the least and had probably the worst job of the crew. The trimmers worked inside the coal bunkers located on top of and between the boilers. The trimmers used shovels and wheelbarrows to move coal around the bunker to keep the coal level, and to shovel the coal down the coal chute to the firemen below to shovel it into the furnaces. If too much coal built up on one side of a coal bunker, the ship would actually list to that side. All the residual heat from the boilers rose up into the coal bunkers, and inside, the bunkers were poorly lit, full of coal dust, and extremely hot from the boilers. Around 20 of them survived.
33 greasers. These men worked in the turbine and reciprocating engine rooms alongside the engineers and they were responsible for maintaining and supplying oil and lubricants for all the mechanical equipment. Only four of them survived.
 Eight electricians; six (one Chief, one senior, and four Assistants) as part of the crew company and an additional two (one senior, one Apprentice) in the Guarantee Group. All eight were lost.
 Six mess hall stewards. These men worked in the crew's kitchen to cook and serve food for the crew: four served the engineering crew; two served the firemen. Just one steward from engineering survived.

Memorials
A memorial to the 244 engineers, firemen, trimmers, and greasers who lost their lives during the sinking of the Titanic is located in the ship's port of registry, Liverpool. It is named the Memorial to the Engine Room Heroes of the Titanic. 
A memorial to the Titanic Engineers in Southampton, from where many of the crew members came.
The Chief Engineer, Joseph Bell (who was born in Farlam), has a headstone at Farlam, near Brampton, Cumbria, in the graveyard of St Thomas a Becket Church.

 Victualling 
There were 421 men and women assigned to the Victualling Department on the Titanic. The Victualling Department provided all the services for the occupants of the ship; food, housekeeping, laundry, room service, etc.:
The Purser, who supervised all of the Victualling Department and was the direct link between passengers and the ship's officers.
322 stewards, who performed over 57 different functions in each class's dining saloon, public rooms, cabins and recreational facilities. Around 60 stewards survived. The most prominent of the stewards' roles were:
Bath Stewards, responsible for maintaining supplies in the communal bathrooms utilised by everyone except for a few First Class Passengers.
Bedroom Stewards, assigned to each class. The First Class Bedroom stewards not only cleaned the rooms and made beds, they were also available to serve food in the rooms or help the passengers in getting dressed. Most stewards were poorly paid and relied on tips for their income. Each First Class Bedroom Steward was responsible for three to five rooms, Second Class Stewards for up to 10 rooms, and Third Class Stewards for as many as 25.
Bellboys (known today as bellhops or porters), teenage boys as young as 14, who helped carry passengers' luggage when needed.
"Boots" (shoe shiners), stewards responsible for cleaning and shining the passengers' boots and shoes. 
Glory-Hole Stewards, whose function was to clean and maintain the crew quarters (nicknamed Glory Holes, derived from a cupboard where useful but miscellaneous items are stored).
Linen Stewards, responsible for washing and maintaining all the linen on board (bed sheets, bathroom towels, table linen, etc.).
62 Galley and kitchen staff, including chefs, cooks, bakers, butchers, and scullions who worked in the kitchens of each class to cook the various meals for the passengers. Scullions, called dishwashers today, were responsible for washing and drying the dishes. Around 13 survived.
20 stewardesses and one matron who were, along with two restaurant cashiers, the only female members of the crew; all but three of whom survived. The stewardesses' duties were similar to the male stewards', although they usually served only women passengers.
13 Storekeepers, only two of whom survived.
Four Clerks, employed in the Purser's Office to deal with passenger's enquiries and requests (including depositing valuables for safekeeping).
The two radio operators, who were actually employed by the Marconi Company and not directly by the White Star Line, were assigned to the Victualling Department, possibly because at the time radio communication was seen principally as a service rather than as an essential part of the ship's operation.
There were also three barbers assigned to the Titanic as part of the vendor group; August H. Weikman and Arthur White worked in First Class and Herbert Klein in Second Class.  None of them were employed by the White Star Line for all three were self-employed and worked mostly for cash tips. The White Star Line only provided their meals and living quarters. Of this group only Weikman survived.

 Restaurant 
The À La Carte Restaurant was located on B Deck, just below the fourth funnel. It was a private concession managed by A. P. Luigi Gatti, an Italian businessman who owned two other restaurants in London, as well as the À La Carte Restaurant on the RMS Olympic. The restaurant was open from 8:00 am to 11:00 pm and was open only to First Class passengers. The staff were not paid by the White Star Line, but by Mr. Gatti himself, who was on the Titanic for its maiden voyage. The restaurant was self-sufficient with its own cooks, waiters, cleanup crew, and other staff. Most of the employees were French or Italian nationals.

Of the entire staff of 66 people, only one male clerk and two female cashiers survived. Several Titanic survivors indicated that the restaurant employees were locked in their quarters by the stewards to prevent them from rushing the lifeboats. It has never been confirmed whether this was true or not.

Postal clerks
The Titanic'' five postal clerks—two British, three American—were charged with the supervision and processing of all incoming and outgoing mail on board the ship. On the night of the disaster, the five postal clerks were celebrating Oscar Woody's 41st birthday. After the ship hit the iceberg, Jago Smith was sent to report to Captain Smith on the mailroom's conditions, confirming the knowledge that the ship was sinking. The five clerks set themselves to the task of attempting to save the 200 registered mail sacks by hauling them to the upper decks, with little thought of their own safety. All five mail clerks died; only March and Woody's bodies were recovered.

Guarantee group 
Though the nine-member guarantee group were given passenger accommodation, they were also regarded as members of the crew. Headed by the ship's designer, Thomas Andrews, the group's responsibility was to accompany the ship on her maiden voyage to oversee any unfinished work or find and fix any problems that might arise during the voyage. The entire group perished; none of their bodies were recovered.

Orchestra 

The ship's eight-member orchestra was not on the White Star Line's payroll but was contracted to White Star by the Liverpool firm of C.W. & F.N. Black, which at that time placed musicians on almost all British liners. The musicians boarded at Southampton and traveled as second-class passengers. Until the night of the sinking, the orchestra performed as two separate entities: a quintet led by violinist and official bandleader Wallace Hartley, that played at teatime, after-dinner concerts, and Sunday services, among other occasions; and a violin, cello, and piano trio comprising Roger Bricoux, George Krins, and Theodore Brailey, that played at the À La Carte Restaurant and the Café Parisien. None of the orchestra members survived.

First and last fatalities 
Reginald Lee – crew (lookout),  of pneumonia
Annie Robinson – crew (stewardess),  (aged 42) by possible suicide by drowning, perhaps due to what would now be recognized as PTSD (See obituary.)
Frank Prentice – crew (storekeeper), 
Sidney Daniels – crew (steward),

See also
Passengers of the RMS Titanic
Seafarer's professions and ranks

References

External links
The Titanic Engineers, by Dr. Denis Griffiths
History of the Titanic
Titanic stewardesses at Millbay Docks, Plymouth England after their return on the SS Lapland(*in PDF with zoom for explosion of photos for easier viewing)
Titanic: From Boiler Room 5 to Lifeboat 13 (Kevin E. Phillips)